Liss Schanche is a Norwegian politician who was Party Secretary of the Socialist Left Party from 1979–1981.

References 

Living people
Socialist Left Party (Norway) politicians
Year of birth missing (living people)